Emily Pettit is an American poet, editor, and publisher from Northampton, Massachusetts. She has authored four books of poetry: Blue Flame (Carnegie Mellon), How (Octopus Books), What Happened to Limbo (Pilot Books), and Goat in the Snow (Birds, LLC). She was shortlisted for The Believer Poetry award.

Education 
She received her MFA in Poetry at University of Iowa and her BA in Contemporary Images at University of Massachusetts, Amherst.

Career 
She teaches poetry at Columbia University, New York, New York. Pettit is an editor for Factory Hollow Press and notnostrums, and publisher of the literary journal jubilat. Goat in the Snow was her first full-length collection of poetry and came out in early 2012. Her second volume of poems, Blue Flame, appeared in 2019 from Carnegie Mellon University Press. Her work has been included in Huffington Post, Academy of American Poets, and Vinyl Poetry. She has previously taught and/or lectured at Flying Object, University of Iowa, University of Massachusetts, and Elms College.

Works and publications 
 Blue Flame (Carnegie Mellon 2019)
 How (Octopus Books)
 What Happened to Limbo (Pilot Books)
 Goat in the Snow (Birds, LLC 2012)

References

External links 
 Official website

Year of birth missing (living people)
Living people
American women poets
University of Iowa alumni
University of Massachusetts Amherst alumni
21st-century American women